Dizabad (also Romanized as Dīzābād) is a village in Khondab Rural District, in the Central District of Khondab County, Markazi Province, Iran. At the 2006 census, its population was 1,378, in 320 families.

References 

Populated places in Khondab County